Florø Radio is a coast radio station from the town of Florø in the municipality of Kinn, Vestland, Norway. Operated by Telenor Maritim Radio, it has the responsibility for North Sea and Norwegian Sea coast between Sognefjord and Rørvik. It was established in 1938.

References

Coast radio stations in Norway
Kinn
1938 establishments in Norway